The 1995–96 United Counties League season was the 89th in the history of the United Counties League, a football competition in England.

Premier Division

The Premier Division featured 19 clubs which competed in the division last season, along with one new club:
St. Neots Town, promoted from Division One

League table

Division One

Division One featured 17 clubs which competed in the division last season, along with two new clubs:
Rothwell Corinthians, joined from the East Midlands Alliance
Yaxley, joined from the West Anglia League

League table

References

External links
 United Counties League

1995–96 in English football leagues
United Counties League seasons